Raffaele "Lello" Arena (born 1 November 1953) is an Italian actor and comics writer. He was also an occasional film director and screenwriter.

Life and career 
Born in Naples as Raffaele Arena, he was the son of two workers in a tobacco factory.  In 1969, at a very young age, Arena formed the cabaret ensemble "La Smorfia" together with Massimo Troisi and Enzo Decaro.  In 1978 and 1979, the group appeared in two RAI variety shows (Non stop and Luna Park) obtaining a great success. The group disbanded in 1980 and for some time Arena kept on collaborating with his friend Troisi, starring in his three first films. He won a David di Donatello for Best Supporting Actor for his performance in Troisi's Scusate il ritardo.

Later Arena focused his career on television, appearing in a large number of variety shows; he occasionally came back to cinema, even making his debut as a director in 1989 with Chiari di luna. He is also active on stage.

Arena also worked as a comics writer, notably for Lupo Alberto and Topolino.

Filmography

References

External links 

1953 births
Male actors from Naples
Italian male stage actors
Italian male film actors
Italian male television actors
David di Donatello winners
Living people
Italian film directors
Italian television personalities
Film people from Naples